HMS Crocodile was a Euphrates-class troopship launched into the Thames from the Blackwall Yard of Money Wigram and Sons on 7 January 1867. She was the fourth and last vessel of the Royal Navy to carry the name.

Design
Crocodile was one of five iron-hulled vessels of the Euphrates class. All five were built to a design of 360 ft overall length by about 49 ft breadth, although Malabar was very slightly smaller than the rest of the class. They had  a single screw, a speed of 14 knots, one funnel, a barque-rig sail plan, three 4-pounder guns, and a white painted hull. Her bow was a "ram bow" which projected forward below the waterline.

Identification
The "Euphrates" Class troopships could each be identified by a different coloured hull band. The Crocodile's hull band was yellow. The blue hull band of her sister Euphrates became the standard for all HM Troopships.

Career

Crocodile was built for the transport of troops between the United Kingdom and the Indian sub-continent, and was operated by the Royal Navy. She carried up to 1,200 troops and family on a passage of approximately 70 days. John Dwyer sank with the loss of four of her crew. Crocodile rescued the survivors. She was commissioned in April 1870 under Captain G H Parkin.

Crocodile was re-engined rather later in life than her sisters, with her single-expansion steam engine replaced with a more efficient compound-expansion type.

Crocodiles last voyage began at Bombay in October 1893. On 3 November, as she was approaching Aden, the high-pressure steam cylinder exploded and the ship came to a halt. The next day she was towed to an anchorage near Aden. Most of the soldiers and their families were brought home on other ships. Crocodile eventually arrived back at Portsmouth on 30 December 1893, having travelled using only the low-pressure steam cylinder, and was not further employed for trooping.

Fate
Crocodile was sold for breaking on 11 May 1894.

Commanding officers

Notes

References

External links
 Emigration of Dockyard Workmen on the Crocodile, 1870 (image) 
 Passenger List, June 1870 (Portsmouth)

 

Euphrates-class troopships
Troop ships of the Royal Navy
Ships built by the Blackwall Yard
Victorian-era naval ships of the United Kingdom
1867 ships